National Highway 122A, commonly called NH 122A is a national highway in  India. It is a spur road of National Highway 22. NH-122A traverses the state of Bihar in India.

Route 
Vishwanathpur Chowk - Koili - Nanpur.

Junctions  

  Terminal near Vishwanathpur Chowk.
  Terminal near Nanpur.

See also 
 List of National Highways in India
 List of National Highways in India by state

References

External links 

 NH 122A on OpenStreetMap

National highways in India
National Highways in Bihar